Akhund Darweza Baba (1533 - 1638) was a Sufi and Islamic scholar and one of the caliphs of Sayyid Ali Tirmizi.

Early life and education
Darweza was born in 1533 to Shaikh Gadai somewhere in Buner District. He had a zeal for religion since childhood. He failed to get a proper education but later he went to make up for his shortcomings and learn Sufism from a few religious scholars like Syed Mesar Ahmad, Mullah Zangi and Mullah Sanjar. He also traveled to Hindustan for knowledge. Akhund met Sayyid Ali Tirmizi (Pir Baba) between 1552 and 1554 through his teacher Mullah Sanjar. Then took the oath of allegiance and received training of Sufism and later became Pir Baba’s caliph.

Opposition to Pir Roshan
Along with Pir Baba they considered a religious duty to protect the Pashtuns from Bayazid Ansari's religious beliefs. And had several debates with him.

Literary works
 Noor Nama Maa Shamayil Nama (Pashto)
 Tazkira tul-Abrar val-Ashrar (Farsi)
 Makhzan E Islam (Pashto) - an old Manuscript

References

1533 births
1638 deaths
Men centenarians
People from Buner District
Indian Sufi saints
Shrines in Pakistan
Swat District
Buner District
16th-century Afghan people
17th-century Afghan people
Peshawar District